The year 1721 in music involved some significant events.

Events 
December 3 – Johann Sebastian Bach marries his second wife, Anna Magdalena.
Antonio Maria Bononcini becomes maestro di cappella in his native city of Modena.
Georg Philipp Telemann becomes director of music in Hamburg.

Classical music 
Johann Sebastian Bach 
Brandenburg Concertos, a collection of five concerti grossi and one ripieno concerto presented to Christian Ludwig, Margrave of Brandenburg-Schwedt. 
Capriccio in E major, BWV 993
Giovanni Bononcini –  Cantate e Duetti
Evaristo Felice Dall'Abaco – 6 Concerti à più istrumenti, Op. 5
Christoph Graupner – Sonata in G minor, GWV 724
George Frideric Handel 
Crudel tiranno amor, HWV 97
Keyboard Sonatina in G minor, HWV 583
Pietro Locatelli – 12 Concerti grossi à 4 e à 5, Op. 1 (including concerto in F minor "Christmas Concerto")
Jean-Philippe Rameau – Orphée, RCT 27
Valentin Rathgeber – Octava musica clavium octo musicarum, R 295
Georg Philipp Telemann  
Ich halte aber dafür, TWV 1:840
Ich hoffe darauf daß du so gnädig bist, TWV 1:847  
Francesco Maria Veracini – 12 Violin Sonatas, Op. 1
Silvius Leopold Weiss – Tombeau sur la mort de M. Comte de Logy arrivée, WSW 20

Opera
Filippo Amadei, Giovanni Bononcini & George Frideric Handel – Muzio Scevola
Giovanni Bononcini – Crispo
George Frideric Handel – Floridante, HWV 14
Michel Richard de Lalande – Les élémens, S.153 (composed with André Cardinal Destouches)
Giuseppe Maria Orlandini – Nerone
Nicola Porpora 
Eumene
Gli orti esperidi
Alessandro Scarlatti – La Griselda
Georg Philipp Telemann – Der Geduldige Socrates
Antonio Vivaldi – La Silvia, RV 734

Theoretical Writings 

 Alexander Malcolm – A Treatise of Musick
 Johann Mattheson – Das forschende Orchestre
 Franz Xaver Murschhauser – Academia Musico-Poetica Bipartita
 Thomas Walter – The Grounds and Rules of Musick Explained

Births 
April 1 – Pieter Hellendaal, organist, violinist and composer (died 1799)
April 7 – Matthias Vanden Gheyn, composer (died 1785)
December 9 – Peter Pelham, organist, harpsichordist and composer (d. 1805)
December 27 (bapt.) – John Garth, composer (died 1810)
date unknown
Barbara Campanini, dancer
Quirino Gasparini, composer (died 1778)
Giovanni Battista Lorenzi, Italian librettist (died 1807)

Deaths 
February 22 – Johann Christoph Bach, organist, elder brother of Johann Sebastian (born 1642)
September 3 – Jan Antonín Losy, lute player and composer (born c. 1643)
date unknown
Jacques Paisible, recorder virtuoso and composer (born c. 1656)
Jerónimo de Carrión, composer (b. 1660)

 
18th century in music
Music by year